The following lists events that happened during 1985 in Chile.

Incumbents
President of Chile: Augusto Pinochet

Events

March
3 March – 1985 Algarrobo earthquake
30 March – Caso Degollados

April
8 April – 1985 Rapel Lake earthquake

Births
8 January – Jorge Aguilar
21 January – Jean Philippe Cretton
5 February – Guillermo Hormazábal
22 February – José Pedro Fuenzalida
11 April – Gustavo Zamudio
24 April – Rubén Castillo
13 June – Bárbara Muñoz

Deaths
date unknown – Cristián Huneeus (b. 1935)

References 

 
Years of the 20th century in Chile
Chile